Lee So-ra (Hangul: 이소라; born December 29, 1969) is a South Korean ballad singer. She made her debut in 1993 as a member of the jazz group Strange People, and she released her first solo album in 1995. She has won multiple awards at the Korean Music Awards, and her sixth album, Nunsseopdal, was included on a list of the 100 greatest Korean albums.

Lee also hosted the music talk show, Lee Sora's Proposal on KBS from 1996 until 2002.

Discography

Studio albums

Compilation albums

Digital singles

References

External links 

 Official website

1969 births
Living people
South Korean women singers
Korean Music Award winners
Incheon National University alumni